The happy wren (Pheugopedius felix) is a species of bird in the family Troglodytidae.  It is endemic to the Pacific slope of western Mexico, from the state of Sonora to the state of Oaxaca, and also on islands west of the Mexican coast.  As with other species of Pheugopedius, older sources (e.g. Howell and Webb) classify it within genus Thryothorus.  Some authorities have treated it as a subspecies of P. rutilus or P. sclateri.  There is significant geographical variation, and six subspecies are recognized: P. f. sonorae is found in southern Sonora and northern Sinaloa; P. f. pallidus is found in central Sinaloa, western Durango and southwards to Jalisco and Michoacán; P. f. lawrencii and P. f. magdalenae are found on different islands of the Islas Marías; P. f. grandis is found in the Balsas River basin, and the nominate subspecies, P. f. felix in southwestern Mexico from Jalisco to Oaxaca.

Description
There is little difference between the sexes as adults.  They are fairly typical small wrens, with a black and white striped face, a downward curving bill, chestnut upperparts and cream underparts.  Howell and Webb give its length as 12.5 – 14 cm.

Habitat
Its natural habitats are subtropical or tropical dry forests, subtropical or tropical moist lowland forests, subtropical or tropical dry shrubland, and heavily degraded former forest.  Its nest is typical of the Pheugopedius wrens, being roughly spherical with an entrance chute at one end, pointing downwards.

References

happy wren
Birds of Mexico
Endemic birds of Mexico
happy wren
happy wren
Taxonomy articles created by Polbot